Sweet Betsey Gulch is a valley in the U.S. state of South Dakota.

Sweet Betsey Gulch was named after a local mine.

References

Landforms of Lawrence County, South Dakota
Valleys of South Dakota